Masamu Yanase (1900–1945; born Shōroku Yanase) was a Japanese visual artist.

Early life
Masamu Yanase was born January 12, 1900, in Ehime, Japan, and his family relocated to Fukuoka where he spent his childhood until age 14. During his teenage years he changed his given name, Shōroku, to Masamu, and included the kanji character for "dream" into his chosen name. At the age of 14, he left his parents home in Kyushu, arriving in Tokyo. Due to lack of income, he traveled between his home and Tokyo to be able to survive. He had an innate talent for art, yet had no art-school training. His abilities allowed him to find patrons for his work, and this in turn enabled him to continue making art.

Career
His early work was in oil painting. In the early 1920s he became interested in the Japanese Futurist movement, and joined the Miraiha-Bijutsu Kyokai (Futurist Art Society). He became interested in political issues, and became intrigued with the Constructivist movement, it was at that time that he joined the avant garde radical art collective, Mavo.

After the Great Kanto Earthquake in 1923, Yanase was arrested during a round-up of radicals, which inspired him to become even more political. In response to this new radical political spirit, he discontinued painting, which he viewed as a bourgeois activity, to begin working on posters, graphics and other forms of mass communication and popular art forms such as comics and cartoons. In 1931, he joined the then illegal Japanese Communist Party. In 1932, he was arrested and tortured by the Special Higher Police on suspicion of violating the Peace Preservation Law. His social commentary cartoons were published in the Yomiuri Shimbun newspaper. Some of Yananse's manga drawings were inspired by the German artist, George Grosz, as in the 1924 manga, The Face of the Bourgeoise Composed out of (the works of) Grosz.

Yanase had a comprehensive one person retrospective exhibition entitled "Yanase Masamu: A Retrospective 1900–1945" at The Museum of Modern Art, Hayama that included over 500 of his works.

Collections
Yanase's work is held in the permanent collection of the National Museum of Art in Japan. The Ohio State University has several of his works held in their Manga Collection. Several of his posters are held in the Tokyo Mushashinoa Art University Collection. His work is held in the permanent collection of The Museum of Modern Art, Kamakura & Hayama. Two books with illustrations by Yanase are in the Museum of Fine Arts, Boston permanent collection.

Death
Yanase was killed at the west exit of Shinjuku station during the Yamanote Air Raid on May 25, 1945.

References

Further reading
 Musan kaikyū no gaka georuge gurossu / Yanase Masamu (無産階級の画家ゲオルゲ。グロッス / 柳瀬正夢著), Tōkyō : Tettō Shoin, Shōwa 4 [1930] (東京 : 鉄塔書院, 昭和) 4 [1930]
 Nejikugi no gaka : botsugo shijūgonen Yanase Masamu ten / henshū Yanase Masamu Sakuhin Seiri Iinkai (ねじ釘の画家 : 沒後四十五年柳瀬正夢展 / 編集柳瀬正夢作品整理委員会), Yanase Masamu, Catalog of an exhibition held at Musashino Bijutsu Daigaku Bijutsu Shiryō Toshokan, Oct. 1990.
 Yanase Masabu Zenshū = Masamu Yanase / Yanase Masamu ; Yanase Masamu Zenshū Kankō Iinkai hen. Kyōto-shi : Sanninsha, 2013–2019. 5 volumes with illustrations, 
 Yanase Masamu: 1900–1945 / henshū Kitakyūshū Shiritsu Bijutsukan. Author: Yanase, Masamu 1900–1945, Kitakyūshū Shiritsu Bijutsukan, JAC Project; Catalog of an exhibition held at Kitakyūshū Shiritsu Bijutsukan, Dec. 14, 2013-Feb. 2, 2014, Kanagawa Kenritsu Kindai Bijutsukan, Feb. 11-Mar. 23, 2014 and Ehime-ken Bijutsukan, Apr. 5-May 18, 2014. 451 pages (2013).

Artist from Ehime Prefecture
Manga artists from Ehime Prefecture
Japanese graphic designers
1900 births
1945 deaths
Deaths by airstrike during World War II
Deaths by American airstrikes
Japanese military personnel of World War II
Japanese military personnel killed in World War II
Japanese torture victims
People from Ehime Prefecture
20th-century Japanese painters